Thomas Massie  (born 1971) is a U.S. Representative from Kentucky.

Thomas Massie may also refer to:
Thomas Massie (burgess) (1675-1731) member of the Virginia House of Burgesses 
 Thomas Massie (Planter) (1747-1834), American Revolutionary War veteran and planter from Virginia. 
Thomas Leeke Massie (1802–1898), admiral in the British Navy
Thomas Massie, see Massie Trial

See also
Thomas Massey (disambiguation)